Hassam Ali Khan (born 16 January 1990) known as Hassam Khan is a Pakistani actor. Khan is known for his lead role of Salman in Geo TV`s drama serial Noor Jahan (2016), Azher in ARY Digital`s Khasara (2018) and Akmal from ARY Digital`s Dil Mom Ka Dia (2018). He is from the family of Pakistani Punjabi actors Akmal Khan and M. Ajmal.

Career 

Khan is the eldest son of Pakistani Urdu poet Suhail Ahmed. Whilst completing his bachelors from Indus Valley school of Art and Architecture, he started his career as a theater actor in 2011 and appeared in several plays such as Come Again (2011) played the iconic role of the founder of Pakistan Mohammad Ali Jinnah in Anwar Maqsood`s Pawnay 14 August at AlHamra Arts Council, Lahore. His directorial and writing debut is a feature film Azaad (Filming) which revolves around the case of a serial killer, Talha Zulfiqar, who has killed nine people. He is also known for the lead role of Saleem in Geo TV`s Eid telefilm Nazar Ke Samnay (2015). His recent appearance was in the role of Salman in the drama serial Noor Jahan (2016) for which he lost up to fifteen kg by following a strict workout and diet routine.

Theater

Filmography

Series

Film

Web series

Telefilm

Awards and nominations

References

External links 
 

1990 births
Living people
Male actors from Karachi
Pakistani male film actors
Pakistani male stage actors
Pakistani male television actors
Indus Valley School of Art and Architecture alumni